German submarine U-2513 was a Type XXI U-boat of Nazi Germany's Kriegsmarine, that was operated by the United States Navy for several years after World War II.

Design
Like all Type XXI U-boats, U-2513 had a displacement of  when at the surface and  while submerged. The submarine was powered by two MAN SE supercharged six-cylinder M6V40/46KBB diesel engines each providing , two Siemens-Schuckert GU365/30 double-acting electric motors each providing , and two Siemens-Schuckert silent running GV232/28 electric motors each providing .

U-2513 was fitted with six  torpedo tubes in the bow and four  C/30 anti-aircraft guns. She could carry twenty-three torpedoes or seventeen torpedoes and twelve mines. The complement was five officers and fifty-two men.

Service history

Kriegsmarine
Her keel was laid down on 19 July 1944 by Blohm & Voss of Hamburg. She was commissioned  on 12 October 1944 with Kapitänleutnant Hans Bungards in command. Bungards was relieved on 27 April 1945 by Fregattenkapitän Erich Topp, who commanded the boat for less than two weeks.

U-2513 conducted no war patrols. On 9 May 1945, Topp surrendered his command at Horten Naval Base, Norway. U-2513 was taken to Oslo on 18 May, then to Lishally, Northern Ireland, which she reached on 9 June. In August 1945, the U-boat was transferred to the United States.

United States Navy
A year later, August 1946, U-2513 began an extensive overhaul in Charleston, South Carolina, which was completed late in September. On 24 September, she departed Charleston and headed for Key West, Florida. The following day, she began six months of duty which included both evaluation tests of the U-boat's design and duty in conjunction with the development of submarine and antisubmarine tactics. The Greater Underwater Propulsion Power Program (GUPPY) would be initiated because of the results of these tests.

On 21 November 1946 President Harry S. Truman became the second American President (after Theodore Roosevelt) to travel on a submarine when he visited U-2513.

On 15 March 1947, U-2513 headed north from Key West, Florida, bound for the New England coast, and arrived at Portsmouth, New Hampshire, on 22 March. She remained there until 8 September when she began six weeks of operations from Portsmouth and New London, Connecticut, under the auspices of the Commander, Submarines, Atlantic Fleet. She concluded that duty on 15 October and departed New London to return to Key West. U-2513 resumed her old duties at Key West five days later and continued them until the summer of 1949.

In mid-June 1949, the submarine moved from Key West north via Norfolk, Virginia, to Portsmouth, New Hampshire, where she was placed out of service in July 1949. She remained at Portsmouth until August 1951 at which time she returned to Key West. On 2 September 1951, the Chief of Naval Operations ordered that the boat be sunk by gunfire. U-2513 was sunk west of Key West, Florida during rocket tests by the destroyer  on 7 October 1951.

She is reachable only by divers experienced in decompression diving at that depth. The site is rarely dived on due to its depth and remote location.

See also

References

Bibliography

External links

hazegray.org: U-2513
 

Captured U-boats
Research submarines of the United States
Ships sunk as targets
Shipwrecks of the Florida Keys
Type XXI submarines
U-boats commissioned in 1944
World War II submarines of Germany
Submarines of the United States Navy
Maritime incidents in 1951
1944 ships
Ships built in Hamburg